Cross-country skiing at the 2017 Asian Winter Games was held in Sapporo, Japan between 20–26 February at Shirahatayama Open Stadium. A total of ten events were contested, five for each gender.

Schedule

Medalists

Men

Women

Medal table

Participating nations
A total of 68 athletes from 14 nations competed in cross-country skiing at the 2017 Asian Winter Games:

 
 
 
 
 
 
 
 
 
 
 
 
 
 

* Australia as guest nation, was ineligible to win any medals.

References

External links
Official Results Book – Cross-country Skiing

 
2017
2017 Asian Winter Games events
2017 in cross-country skiing